Three's A Crowd is a 1930 Broadway revue with lyrics by Howard Dietz and others, and music by Arthur Schwartz and others.  It was “put together” by Howard Dietz, and produced by Max Gordon.

Production
Three's A Crowd premiered on Broadway at the Selwyn Theatre on October 15, 1930, and closed on June 6, 1931, after 271 performances.

It was “compiled” by Howard Dietz; staged by Hassard Short; dances by Albertina Rasch; with additional songs by Johnny Green, Vernon Duke, Burton Lane, and others.  It had settings by Albert R. Johnson and costumes designed by Kiviette.

The cast included Fred Allen, Libby Holman, Clifton Webb, Tamara Geva with Fred MacMurray.

Reception 
The New York Times opening night review said, “Those responsible for “Three's A Crowd,” and Howard Dietz seems to be chief among them, have put together a bright, smart and tasteful show.  It has a pleasant lightness, a sort of unforced gayety, and, for the most part, a quizzical, knowing point of view.” 

Stanley Green reported that, “The piece that made the biggest hit, however, was the only one that Dietz was not associated with –“Body and Soul,” by Johnny Green, Robert Sour, and Edward Heymann. . . . The best of the Schwartz and Dietz inspirations was “Something to Remember You By,” a ballad of unhappy leave-talking sung by Miss Holman to a sailor who stood with his back to the audience.  He was played by Fred MacMurray."

Songs 
 “Body and Soul” (words by Edward Heymann and Robert Sour; music by John W. Green)
 “Something to Remember You By” (words by Howard Dietz; music by Arthur Schwartz)
 “Right at the Start of It” (words by Howard Dietz; music by Arthur Schwartz)
 “Forget All Your Books” (words by Howard Dietz and Samuel M. Lehrer; music by Burton Lane)
 “Out in the Open Air” (words by Howard Dietz and Ted Pola; music by Burton Lane)
 “The Moment I Saw You” (words by Howard Dietz; music by Arthur Schwartz)
 “Yaller”
 “Practising Up On You” (words by Howard Dietz; music by Phil Charig)
 “All the King’s Horses”

References

Sources
 Ewen, David. Complete Book of the American Musical Theater, (2nd Ed.) Henry Holt and Company, New York, 1959, pp. 294.
 Green, Stanley, The World of Musical Comedy, Ziff-David Publishing Co., New York, 1960, p. 187-188.
 Mantle, Burns, ed., The Best Plays of 1930-31, Dodd, Mead & Company, New York, 1931, p. 432.

External links
 
 
 That’s Entertainment
 1930’s – Part II: Legendary Revues
Three's A Crowd
Broadway musicals
Revues